Electoral history of Aman Tuleyev, 2nd Governor of Kemerovo Oblast.

People's Deputy of the Soviet Union

Yury Golik — 56.6%
Aman Tuleyev — 35.6%

Russian presidential election, 1991

Russian presidential election, 1996
Aman Tuleyev was registered as a presidential candidate, however, a few days before the election, withdrew in favor of Gennady Zyuganov, but received 308 votes during the early voting (up to the withdrawal of the candidature), which were credited as valid.

Kemerovo Oblast gubernatorial election, 1997

Russian presidential election, 2000

Kemerovo Oblast gubernatorial election, 2001

Kemerovo Oblast gubernatorial election, 2015

Chairman of the Council of People's Deputies of Kemerovo Oblast

2018

References

Tuleyev